My 53 may refer to one of the following television stations in the United States:

KNXT-LD, MyNetworkTV affiliate in Bakersfield, California
KMSG-LD, MyNetworkTV affiliate in Fresno, California